The Road Less Travelled is the second studio album by Norwegian heavy metal band Triosphere. It was released in 2010 by AFM Records. It is the first album to including new guitarist Tor Ole Byberg, with the band expanding into a quartet.

The album's style is different from its predecessor, Onwards, as it has a more melodic sound. "Echoes" is an all-piano and cello instrumental medley of the tracks 2 to 10. The Japanese edition also includes "Lawless", in tribute to Blackie Lawless, and a cover of the Guns N' Roses's song "Welcome to the Jungle". Guitarist Marius Silver Bergensenn wrote all instrumental parts, with vocal melodies and lyrics by singer and bassist Ida Haukland.

Production 
In July 2010, Ida Haukland said the new album "...is about daring to choose a path that, even though it might be unconventional or more challenging, nevertheless leads you towards your goal and ambitions."

The Road Less Travelled is produced by Silver and Haukland, making it the first disc of the band to be only produced by the band itself. This time, Silver is not credited for any lyrics, and Haukland for any music (except for all the vocal melodies). The album thanks includes the bands W.A.S.P., Arch Enemy and Kamelot and the singer Jørn Lande.

Track listing

1Bergensenn is credited solely for composing the music, but Haukland is credited for "lyrics and vocals melodies", meaning that she acted as composer for the vocals parts.

Reception 

Since its release, The Road Less Travelled has received very favourable reviews. Blistering.com gave the album a good review staging Triosphere were a "Smart, savvy, free-of-pretense progressive metal". The review went on to conclude "we’re looking at the future of power/progressive metal right in front of our faces".

Dangerdog Music Reviews stated the three ingredients of the album were "bulletproof chops, songwriting skill, and imagination" and "beyond recommended" the album, giving it the maximum rating. The Road Less Travelled was later choose as one of the fifteen Albums of the Year, with the site making it at the top of the internet page with the words "Complete and utter perfection. What more is there to say?".

Personnel

Triosphere
 Ida Haukland - vocals and bass
 Marius Silver Bergesen - lead and rhythm guitar
 Tor Ole Byberg - rhythm guitar
 Ørjan Aare Jørgensen - drums

Additional personnel 
 Espen Godø - keyboards and mellotron
 Kjell Magne Robak - cello on (4, 7, 8 and 12)
 Arild Følstad - piano (on 12)
 Erling Malm - backing vocals (on 5 and 6)
 Alessandro Elide - percussion (on 2 and 10)

Production 
 Marius Silver Bergesen, Ida Haukland - production
 Tommy Hansen - mixing

References

External links 
 Official Triosphere website

Triosphere albums
2010 albums